Governor Lowndes may refer to:

Lloyd Lowndes Jr. (1845–1905), 43rd Governor of Maryland
Rawlins Lowndes (1721–1800), 32nd Governor of South Carolina